Carry Me Away may refer to:

 "Carry Me Away", a 2019 song by John Mayer from Sob Rock
 "Carry Me Away", a 1981 song by Rick Springfield from Working Class Dog